The following outline is an overview of and topical guide to the state of Gujarat in Western India, sometimes called the "Jewel of Western India". It is bordered by Rajasthan to the north, Maharashtra to the south, Madhya Pradesh to the east, and the Arabian Sea and the Pakistani province of Sindh to the west. Its capital city is Gandhinagar, and its largest city is Ahmedabad. Gujarat is home to the Gujarati-speaking people of India.

General reference

Names 
 Common English name(s): Gujarat
 Pronunciation:  , 
 Official English name(s): State of Gujarat
 Nickname(s):
 Adjectival(s): Gujarati
 Demonym(s): Gujaratis

Rankings (amongst India's states) 

 by population: 9th
 by area (2011 census): 6th
 by crime rate (2015): 14th
 by gross domestic product (GDP) (2020): 4th
by Human Development Index (HDI):
by life expectancy at birth:
by literacy rate:

Geography of Gujarat 

Geography of Gujarat
 Gujarat is: an Indian state
 Population of Gujarat:
 Area of Gujarat:
 Atlas of Gujarat

Location of Gujarat 
 Gujarat is situated within the following regions:
 Northern Hemisphere
 Eastern Hemisphere
 Eurasia
 Asia
 South Asia
 India
 Western India
 Time zone:  Indian Standard Time (UTC+05:30)

Environment of Gujarat 

Environment of Gujarat
 Climate of Gujarat
 Protected areas of Gujarat
 National parks and wildlife sanctuaries of Gujarat
 Wildlife of Gujarat
 Fauna of Gujarat
 Butterflies of Gujarat

Natural geographic features of Gujarat 

Landforms of Gujarat
 Bodies of water of Gujarat
 Rivers of Gujarat
 Narmada River
 Sabarmati River
 Tapti River
 Aji River
 Mahi River
 River Ghela
 Rukmavati River
 Vishwamitri River
 West Banas River
 Daman Ganga River
 Waterfalls of Gujarat
 Hills in Gujarat
Chotila
Pavagadh Hill
Palitana
Saputara
Girnar
 Mountain ranges in Gujarat
Vindhya
Satpura range
Aravali range

Administrative divisions of Gujarat

Districts of Gujarat 

 Districts of Gujarat

Municipalities of Gujarat 

Municipalities of Gujarat

 Capital of Gujarat: Capital of Gujarat
 Cities of Gujarat
 Cities in Gujarat by population

Demography of Gujarat 

Demographics of Gujarat

Government and politics of Gujarat 

Government of Gujarat

 Form of government: Indian state government (parliamentary system of representative democracy)
 Capital of Gujarat: Capital of Gujarat
 Elections in Gujarat
 (specific elections)
 Political families of Gujarat

Union government in Gujarat 
 Rajya Sabha members from Gujarat
 Gujarat Pradesh Congress Committee
 Indian general election, 2009 (Gujarat)
 Indian general election, 2014 (Gujarat)

Branches of the government of Gujarat 

Government of Gujarat

Executive branch of the government of Gujarat 

 Head of state: Governor of Gujarat,
 Head of government: Chief Minister of Gujarat,
 Council of Ministers of Gujarat
 Departments and agencies of Gujarat
 Gujarat State Road Transport Corporation
 Gujarat Industrial Development Corporation
 Gujarat Pollution Control Board
 Gujarat State Wide Area Network
 Gujarat State Financial Corporation
 Gujarat Mineral Development Corporation

Legislative branch of the government of Gujarat 

Gujarat Legislative Assembly
 Constituencies of Gujarat Legislative Assembly
 Leader of Opposition in Gujarat Vidhansabha

Judicial branch of the government of Gujarat 

 Gujarat High Court
 Chief Justice of Gujarat

Law and order in Gujarat 

Law of Gujarat
 Law enforcement in Gujarat
 Gujarat Police
 Gujarat Marine Police

History of Gujarat 

History of Gujarat

History of Gujarat, by period

Prehistoric Gujarat 
 Lower Paleolithic
 Middle Paleolithic
 Upper Paleolithic

Ancient Gujarat 
 Indus Valley Civilization
 Harappan civilization
 Dholavira
 Mauryan Empire
 Western Satraps
 Gupta Empire
 Maitraka
 Saindhava

Medieval Gujarat 

 Gujarat Sultanate
 Rana Sanga's invasion of Gujarat

Colonial Gujarat 
 Baroda, Western India and Gujarat States Agency
 Saurashtra (state)
 Kutch State
 Bombay Presidency
 Bombay State
 Gujarat

History of Gujarat, by region

History of Gujarat, by subject 
 History of stepwells in Gujarat

Culture of Gujarat 

Culture of Gujarat
 Architecture of Gujarat
 Forts in Gujarat
 Cuisine of Gujarat
 Languages of Gujarat
 Monuments in Gujarat
 Monuments of National Importance in Gujarat
 State Protected Monuments in Gujarat
 World Heritage Sites in Gujarat

Art in Gujarat 
 Music of Gujarat

People of Gujarat 

People of Gujarat
 Pathans of Gujarat
 People from Gujarat

Religion in Gujarat 

Religion in Gujarat
 Christianity in Gujarat
 Hinduism in Gujarat

Sports in Gujarat 

Sports in Gujarat
 Cricket in Gujarat
 Gujarat Cricket Association
 Gujarat cricket team
 Football in Gujarat
 Gujarat State Football Association
 Gujarat Premier Hockey League

Symbols of Gujarat 

Symbols of Gujarat
 State animal:lion
 State bird:Surkhab
 State flower:Marigold
 State seal: Seal of Gujarat
 State tree:Banayan

Economy and infrastructure of Gujarat 

Economy of Gujarat
 Communications of Gujarat
 Newspapers in Gujarat
 Gujarat Samachar
 Conglomerates in Gujarat
 Currency of Gujarat:
 Tourism in Gujarat
 Transportation in Gujarat
 List of state highways in Gujarat

Education in Gujarat 

Education in Gujarat
 Gujarat Secondary and Higher Secondary Education Board
 Institutions of higher education in Gujarat
 Central University of Gujarat
 Gujarat University
 Gujarat Technological University

Health in Gujarat 

Health in Gujarat

See also 

 Outline of India

References

External links 

 Gujarat Government Website
 
 Map of Gujarat by MapsofIndia.com
 Gujarati Songs by Gaana.com

Gujarat
Gujarat